The Clemson Tigers women's basketball team represents Clemson University in women's college basketball competition. The Tigers compete in NCAA Division I as a member of the Atlantic Coast Conference (ACC). Clemson won the ACC women's basketball tournament in 1996 and 1999, and won the ACC regular season title in 1981. They are coached by Amanda Butler, who is in her fourth year with the team.

Team history 
Clemson began sponsoring a women's basketball team in the 1975–76 season. After winning the ACC regular season championship in 1980–81, the Tigers were invited to the inaugural NCAA Women's Division I Basketball Championship in 1982. In total, Clemson has participated in 15 NCAA Tournaments. The Tigers won two ACC women's basketball tournaments in 1996 and 1999, under coach Jim Davis.

Awards 

ACC Coach of the Year
 Jim Davis - 1990, 1994

ACC Player of the Year
 Jessica Barr - 1994

ACC Rookie of the Year
 Barbara Kennedy - 1979
 Shelia Cobb - 1980
 Kerry Boyatt - 1990

ACC 50th Anniversary Team
 Jessica Barr
 Chrissy Floyd
 Barbara Kennedy
 Itoro Umoh

 All-Americans
 1981 - Barbara Kennedy (Street & Smith)
 1982 - Barbara Kennedy (Kodak, WBCA, Basketball Weekly)
 1994 - Jessica Barr (Kodak)

 ACC All-Defensive Team
 Erin Batth - 2000, 2001
 Chrissy Floyd - 2002
 Lele Hardy - 2009, 2010

 Retired Jersey
 42 - Barbara Kennedy

All-ACC First Team
 Donna Forester - 1978
 Cissy Bristol - 1979
 Barbara Kennedy - 1980, 1981, 1982
 Mary Anne Cubelic - 1982, 1983
 Janet Knight - 1985
 Shandy Bryan - 1993
 Jessica Barr - 1994
 Tara Saunooke - 1995
 Stephanie Ridgeway - 1996
 Amy Green - 1998, 1999
 Itoro Umoh - 1999
 Chrissy Floyd - 2002, 2003
 Lakeia Stokes - 2004
 Delicia Washington - 2021

 All-ACC Second Team
 Bobbie Mims - 1978
 Barbara Kennedy - 1979
 Janet Knight - 1984
 Jacqui Jones - 1984
 Sandy Bishop - 1985
 Karen Ann Jenkins - 1988
 Louise Greenwood - 1989
 Michelle Bryant - 1989
 Kerry Boyatt - 1990
 Jackie Farmer - 1991
 Cheron Wells - 1992
 Itoro Umoh - 1997, 1998
 Chrissy Floyd - 2000, 2001
 Erin Batth - 2001
 Lele Hardy - 2010

 All-ACC Third Team
 Angie Cossey - 2000
 Marci Glenney - 2002
 Lele Hardy - 2009

Coaching history

Current coaching staff 
 Head coach: Amanda Butler
 Assistant coach: Joy Cheek
 Assistant coach: Daniel Barber
 Assistant coach: Priscilla Edwards
 Director of Basketball Operations: Shellie Greenman

Year by year results 

Conference tournament winners noted with # Source 

|-style="background: #ffffdd;"
| colspan="8" align="center" | Atlantic Coast Conference

Postseason results

NCAA Division I
The Tigers have appeared in 16 NCAA Tournaments, with a record of 15–16.

AIAW Division I
The Tigers made one appearance in the AIAW National Division I basketball tournament, with a combined record of 0–1.

References

External links